Fifty Fifty (Urdu script: ففٹی ففٹی) is a popular Pakistan Television Corporation sketch comedy series which was aired on the national television PTV from 1978 to 1984, based loosely on the American comedy show Saturday Night Live. The programme was a sketch comedy considered by many critics as one of the best television shows to be produced in Pakistan.

The content of the show includes satire and parody, with some slapstick comedy. It is widely considered to be a trendsetter in its genre, with its content being ethnically balanced and written to respect all Pakistani communities. 
Regulars on the show included TV actors Ismail Tara, Zeba Shehnaz, Ashraf Khan, and Majid Jahangir. Some golden-era songs of Naheed Akhtar and Ghulam Ali were also featured on the show. It was produced and directed by acclaimed Pakistani film and TV director Shoaib Mansoor and written by Anwar Maqsood.

Fifty Fifty and Alif Noon are the two prominent comedy series in Pakistan television in the 1980s. Their writers were regarded as being dedicated to creativity and patriotic values, and that is why they are still the most-in-demand comedy serials.

Cast
Majid Jahangir
Ismail Tara
Zeba Shehnaz
 Ashraf Khan
Bushra Ansari
Durdana Butt
Arshad Mehmood
Asma Abbas
Javed Sheikh
Mukhtiar Surhio
Latif Kapadia
Pandit Satyanashi
Salahuddin Toofani
Umer Shareef
Anwar Maqsood
 Fareed Khan
Ghulam Mustafa
Moin Akhtar

Awards

References

Pakistani television series
Pakistan Television Corporation original programming
Pakistani comedy television series
Television sketch shows
Urdu-language television shows
1970s Pakistani television series
1980s Pakistani television series